Rabbi Simon can refer to:

 Rabbi Shimon bar Yochai, a tanna
 Rabbi Shimon ben Pazi, an amora, often called Rabbi Simon (רבי סימון) in the Jerusalem Talmud